Huo Da (born 26 November 1945) is a Chinese female writer of Hui ethnicity. She  also is a film editor. Her Hui name is Fa Tumai. One of her works, The Muslim's Funeral won the Mao Dun Literature Prize in 1991. It has been translated into English, French, Arabic and Urdu.

Her most famous novel, and the only one to be translated into English, was the 1988 Muslim Funeral, which chronicled the history of three generations of a family of Muslim jade carvers in Beijing; it provoked controversy for its positive attitude towards market entrepreneurialism and its suggestion that the Han in Beijing negatively stereotype the Hui for their poverty and lack of education, while they do not have the same attitude towards the Manchu.

Biography
Huo Da was born into a family of scholars on 26 November 1945 in Beijing. She graduated from Beijing Construction College in 1966. And then she engaged in translation work for many years. In 1976, she became a film editor of Beijing Film Studio. In 1978, she was transferred into Beijing television art center and started her professional writing career.

Works
 The Muslim's Funeral (1982)
 I'm not a Hunter (1982)
 Red (1985)
 War (1988)
 The split Sky (1997)
 霍达文集 (Collected Works of Huo Da). Beijing October Literature and Arts Publishing House, August 1999. .
 红尘 (Red Dust). Beijing October Literature and Arts Publishing House, April 2005. .
 万家忧乐 (The Worry and Joy of Thousands of Households)
 龙驹 (Dragon Foal)
 Magpie Bridge

References

Further reading

 

1945 births
Living people
Screenwriters from Beijing
Hui people
Chinese women novelists
Chinese women screenwriters
Mao Dun Literature Prize laureates
People's Republic of China politicians from Beijing
Members of the 8th Chinese People's Political Consultative Conference
Delegates to the 9th National People's Congress
Members of the Standing Committee of the 10th Chinese People's Political Consultative Conference
Members of the Standing Committee of the 11th Chinese People's Political Consultative Conference